Shane Kline (born April 11, 1989) is an American cyclist, who currently rides for UCI Continental team .

Major results

2005
 2nd Road race, National Cadet Road Championships
2012
 3rd TD Bank Mayor's Cup
2013
 1st Dana Point Grand Prix
 2nd TD Bank Mayor's Cup
2014
 1st Thompson Bucks County Criterium
 3rd TD Bank Mayor's Cup
 5th White Spot / Delta Road Race
2016
 3rd TD Bank Mayor's Cup
2017
 1st Stage 4 Cascade Cycling Classic
 1st Reading Radsport Criterium	
2018
 1st  Team pursuit, National Track Championships
 1st Tour of Somerville
 2nd Road race, National Amateur Road Championships
2019
 1st Reading Radsport Criterium

References

External links

1989 births
American male cyclists
Living people
People from Berks County, Pennsylvania
American track cyclists